Ivor Robinson MBE (28 October 1924 – 19 February 2014) was a British master craftsman and fine bookbinder, one of the most important of the late 20th century. He is particularly known for his mature work with gold-tooled lines on black leather. His work is held in high esteem, entering many public and private collections around the world, and fetching good prices at auction. He was also an influential teacher of bookbinding. He was awarded an MBE 'For Services to Bookbinding.'

Personal life and biography 

Robinson was born and raised in Bournemouth (then Hampshire; now Dorset), England. (His younger brother, Brian Robinson, also a bookbinder, still lives there.) He was apprenticed at age 14 with bookbinder S. E. Bray & Co. He volunteered to enlist in the Navy during World War II, where he was present at D-Day, and returned to Bray's to finish his apprenticeship after the War.

In 1946, Robinson moved to Salisbury to work with binder Harry Bailey, eventually going into partnership with him. While in Salisbury he also taught bookbinding part-time at Salisbury College of Art, where he met Olive Trask, whom he married 14 April 1952. They had two children, Hilary Robinson (1956– ) and Martin Robinson (1962– ).

Teaching 
Ivor Robinson taught at the London School of Printing and Graphic Arts (now London College of Communication, part of the University of the Arts London) from 1953, then in 1958 moved to Oxford to teach at the Oxford College of Technology, which became Oxford Polytechnic and later Oxford Brookes University. He retired from the Polytechnic in 1989.

Bookbinding 
Robinson's bindings are in private and public collections around the world, including the British Library; the Bodleian Library, Oxford; and the Pierpont Morgan Library (Now the Morgan Library & Museum), New York

Robinson has been called 'one of the world's most highly regarded binders' and one 'of the great bookbinders of the day' and his bindings have been shown in over one hundred exhibitions since 1951 and are in several royal, public and private collections in many parts of the world. An eight-tape interview with Robinson about his life and work is held by the British Library as part of its 'Crafts Lives' archive.
A Robinson binding was sold for £5000 in 2009. Another, The Illiad, was listed for $5000 in 2005 The seller, Joshua Heller Rare Books, Inc., of Washington DC, describes Robinson: "After war service in the Royal Navy, he completed his apprenticeship with a local bookbinder and then worked in Salisbury with Harry Bailey as Bailey and Robinson, Bookbinders. A Robinson binding of Virgil's Georgics was listed by Thomas Goldwasser Rare Books, San Francisco, Winter 2013, for $13,500

Prizes and awards 
He was elected a Fellow of the Guild of Contemporary Bookbinders in 1955 and President from 1968 to 1973 of its successor, Designer Bookbinders. He was a triple medallist at the Prix Paul Bonet in Switzerland in 1971. He was awarded an M.B.E. by Queen Elizabeth II.

References 

1924 births
2014 deaths
Academics of Oxford Brookes University
Academics of the University of the Arts London
Bookbinders
Members of the Order of the British Empire
People from Bournemouth
Royal Navy personnel of World War II